Milford railway station is a railway station serving the village of Milford in the English county of Surrey.

The station has two side platforms flanking a pair of tracks, with step free access to both platforms. The platforms are linked by a publicly accessible footbridge and an adjoining level crossing controlled by safety barriers. There is a ticket office, staffed during weekday mornings only, on the northbound platform, and ticket machines are available at all times the station is open. The station car park has 136 spaces.

The station has the same name as the fictional station in the film Brief Encounter (1945) starring Trevor Howard and Celia Johnson, although the scenes were filmed at Carnforth station in Lancashire.

Services 
All services at Milford are operated by South Western Railway using  and  EMUs.

The typical off-peak service in trains per hour is:
 1 tph to  via 
 1 tph to 

References

External links 

Railway stations in Surrey
DfT Category E stations
Former London and South Western Railway stations
Railway stations in Great Britain opened in 1859
Railway stations served by South Western Railway